For the British medical drama television series Casualty, List of Casualty episodes may refer to:

 List of Casualty episodes (series 1–20)
 List of Casualty episodes (series 21–present)

Series overview

Notes